Evan Welling Thomas III (born April 25, 1951) is an American journalist, historian, and author. He is the author of nine books, including two New York Times bestsellers.

Early life and career
Thomas was born in Huntington, New York, and raised in nearby Cold Spring Harbor. A graduate of Phillips Academy, Harvard University (B.A.), and the University of Virginia School of Law (J.D.), from 1991 he was a reporter, writer, and editor at Newsweek for 24 years. Prior to that, he was at Time. Thomas began his reporting career at The Bergen Record in northeastern New Jersey.

In 1992, DCI Robert Gates granted Thomas historical access to view classified Central Intelligence Agency files. The fundamental authority for this policy is Executive Order 12356 (April 1982), as implemented in HR 10–24(c)4. Under these provisions, CIA may grant individual researchers and former presidential appointees access to classified files, once the recipient of this access signs a secrecy agreement and agrees to allow the agency to review his manuscript to ensure that it contains no classified information. Former DCI Robert Gates directed that the CIA history staff locate and provide records that would satisfy Thomas's research request. Thomas's manuscript was subsequently reviewed in accordance with his secrecy agreement and approved on March 2, 1995, by the information review officer of the Directorate of Operations, with the concurrence of the Office of General Counsel. In 1996, Thomas penned an article for the Central Intelligence Agency's journal, Studies in Intelligence, describing his experience having been granted the rare privilege of historical access to CIA's classified files.

Thomas was, for 20 years, a regular panelist on the weekly public affairs TV show Inside Washington until the show ceased production in December 2013.

He taught writing and journalism at Harvard and Princeton between 2003 and 2014. For seven years, from 2007 to 2014, he was the Ferris Professor of Journalism in residence at Princeton.

Family
He is the son of Anna Davis (née Robins) and Evan Welling Thomas II, an editor who worked for HarperCollins and W. W. Norton & Company. His grandfather, Norman Thomas, was a six-time presidential candidate for the Socialist Party of America.

He is married, and he and his wife, an attorney, are the parents of two daughters, including writer Louisa Thomas. They live in Washington, D.C.

Works
Books
The Wise Men: Six Friends and the World They Made. Walter Isaacson, Evan Thomas, Simon & Schuster, 1986; Simon & Schuster, 1997. 
The Man to See: The Life of Edward Bennett Williams. Simon & Schuster, 1992. 
The Very Best Men: The Early Years of the CIA. Simon & Schuster, 1996. 
Back from the Dead: How Clinton Survived the Republican Revolution. Atlantic Monthly Press, 1997. 
Robert Kennedy: His Life. Simon & Schuster, 2000. 
John Paul Jones: Sailor, Hero, Father of the American Navy. Simon & Schuster, 2004. 
Sea of Thunder: Four Naval Commanders and the Last Sea War. Simon & Schuster, 2007. 
A Long Time Coming: The Inspiring, Combative 2008 Campaign and the Historic Election of Barack Obama. PublicAffairs, 2009. 
The War Lovers: Roosevelt, Lodge, Hearst, and the Rush to Empire, 1898, Little, Brown and Company, 2010, 
Ike's Bluff: President Eisenhower's Secret Battle to Save the World. Little, Brown and Company, 2012.
Being Nixon: A Man Divided. Random House, 2015. 
First: Sandra Day O'Connor. Random House, 2019. 
Road to Surrender: Three Men and the Countdown to the End of World War II. Random House, 2023 (forthcoming). 

Articles
 Tomas, Evan (1996). "A Singular Opportunity – Gaining Access to CIA's Records". Studies in Intelligence. 39 (5): 19–23.

References

External links

 
 

1951 births
American male journalists
Harvard University alumni
Historians of the Central Intelligence Agency
21st-century American historians
21st-century American male writers
Living people
Newsweek people
People from Cold Spring Harbor, New York
Phillips Academy alumni
Princeton University faculty
Time (magazine) people
University of Virginia School of Law alumni
Historians from New York (state)
American male non-fiction writers